Chavenage House, Beverston, Gloucestershire is a country house dating from the late 16th century. The house was built in 1576 and is constructed of Cotswold stone, with a Cotswold stone tiled roof. David Verey and Alan Brooks, in their Gloucestershire Pevsner, describe the house as "the ideal sixteenth-century Cotswold stone manor house". Chavenage is a Grade I listed building.

History
The estate of Chavenage was sold to Edward Stephens of Eastington in Gloucestershire in 1564. He built the house in the Elizabethan style, adding large windows to the south of the porch, much of the glass being obtained from redundant churches and monasteries in the area. On Edward's death, the estate passed to his son Richard and, on his death, to his second wife Anne, before his eldest son Nathaniel Stephens inherited it.

During the Civil War, Nathaniel Stephens raised troops and supported the Roundheads, and later became a member of Cromwell's parliament. Cromwell visited Chavenage House, and Stephens supported his planned regicide, and although he was not one of the signatories of Charles I's death warrant, he is nevertheless said to have died of remorse soon afterwards. It is also recounted that on the day of the Nathaniel's death, his ghost was seen leaving the house in a coach driven by a headless coachman dressed like the hapless king. The house is reputed to be one of the nation's most haunted homes.

In 1801 the house was inherited by Henry Wills Stephens who added the billiard room and added panelling and carvings to many of the rooms. The house has been owned by the Lowsley-Williams family since 1891. They employed the architect John T. Micklewaite who added the east wing which includes an oak panelled ballroom.

In 1944, the house was requisitioned and housed American troops prior to the Normandy landings in France.

The house
The house is an Elizabethan house and is a Grade I listed building. It was built originally in 1576 by Edward Stephens. It has an E-shaped plan with a porch at the centre of the east side. It is constructed of rubble stone with a stone slate roof and has two storeys and attics. It was enlarged in the seventeenth century and further extended in the eighteenth century by the Rev Richard Stephens, then again at the start of the 20th century. As these additions are in keeping with the original style and materials, they appear as one consistent building and the new areas are not obvious. David Verey and Alan Brooks, in their first volume of the Pevsner Architectural Guide to the county, describe Chavenage as "the ideal 16th-century Cotswold stone manor house".

The interior has a former open great hall, but this has now had a ceiling installed, with an altered minstrels' gallery over a screen. This is sixteenth century as is the Renaissance style fireplace and the panelling and Gothic fireplace in the dining room. Other notable features of the house are the two tapestry rooms Cromwell's and Ireton's Room; the stained glass windows in the Great Hall; the Oak Room which has elaborate 1590 panelling. Additionally, there is an Edwardian wing, featuring a sprung-floored ballroom.

Close to the house is the family chapel which is included in the Grade I listing. It has a  tower, built as a folly in the seventeenth century, with two stages, stepped diagonal buttresses and a parapet with embattlements. The main fabric of the chapel is eighteenth century and it has an undercover link to the house.

Visiting Chavenage
The house is open to the public on a limited basis. It is also available for use for conferences and functions and as a wedding venue.

Chavenage as a filming location 
Chavenage has been used in films and for television programmes, including Barry Lyndon, The Ghost of Greville Lodge, the first Hercule Poirot story The Mysterious Affair at Styles; a 'Gotcha' for Noel's House Party, The Barchester Chronicles; Berkeley Square; Cider with Rosie; Grace & Favour; The House of Eliott; Casualty and Dracula.  From 2008 the house featured as Candleford Manor in the BBC's Lark Rise to Candleford.  Scenes from Bonekickers, Tess of the D'Urbervilles, starring Eddie Redmayne and In Love with Barbara were shot at Chavenage in 2008.

Recent credits include Rosamunde Pilcher's The Four Seasons, the BBC's Nightwatch and the CBBC's series Sparticles.  Two productions were shot at Chavenage in 2013, The Unknown Heart, based on an idea by Rosamunde Pilcher as well the historical drama New Worlds (Channel 4), starring Jamie Dornan.  Chavenage is Trenwith House in the new adaption of Winston Graham's Poldark (2015 TV series), starring Aidan Turner.

See also 
 Nathaniel Stephens, whose story, and its headless coachman, gave rise to the most notable of Chavenage's ghost stories

References

Sources

External links 

Photos of Chavenage House and surrounding area on geograph
Chavenage House official website
Chavenage House on The Internet Movie Database

Country houses in Gloucestershire
Historic house museums in Gloucestershire
Grade I listed houses in Gloucestershire